Ewesdale is a glen and former lordship in Dumfries and Galloway, Scotland. The Ewes Water runs through the valley from its source at Mosspaul, until it enters the River Esk at Langholm. The A7 Road, that runs through the valley from Langholm and continues to Hawick, was built in the 18th century at the initiative of Sir William Pulteney.

References
Groome, Francis Hindes, Ordnance Gazetteer of Scotland: A Survey of Scottish Topography, Statistical, Biographical and Historical, 

Glens of Scotland
Landforms of Dumfries and Galloway